The 1975 B.A.R.C. BP Super Visco British F3 Championship was the 25th season of the British Formula 3 season. Sweden's Gunnar Nilsson took the title.

After the poor 1974 season, Formula Three was completely revived in 1975, not just in Britain but in Italy, Sweden and Germany. The British series, sponsored by BP and organised by the B.A.R.C., was the most important of these as it was the only one open to drivers of all nationalities and was regarded by some as the effective European championship. There was also a European Cup, but in this first season it was barely noticed. The BP championship dominated by three works operations: March, with drivers Gunnar Nilsson and Alex Ribeiro, Modus, with Danny Sullivan, and Safir, with Patrick Nève. The works GRD operation also mounted a comeback but it was a failure, despite a surprise GRD win at Monaco, and the company collapsed the following year. Nilsson was a worthy champion, winning five British championship events plus three others, including the opening round of the Swedish series in April.

B.A.R.C. BP Super Visco British F3 Championship
Champion:  Gunnar Nilsson

Joint Runners-up:  Alex Ribeiro &  Danny Sullivan

Results

Drivers' Championship

Table

References

British Formula Three Championship seasons
Formula Three